Saxån is a river in Skåne County in Sweden.

References

Rivers of Skåne County